Parachurch organizations are Christian faith-based organizations that usually carry out their mission independent of church oversight.

Most parachurch organizations, at least those normally called parachurch, are Protestant and Evangelical.  Some of these organizations cater to a defined spectrum among evangelical beliefs, but most are self-consciously interdenominational and many are ecumenical.

Roles that parachurch organizations undertake include larger more national or international movements:
Evangelistic crusade associations (patterned after the Billy Graham Evangelistic Association)
Evangelistic and discipleship ministries (such as The Navigators, Cru (Christian organization), and InterVarsity Christian Fellowship)
Music and print publishers, radio and television stations, film studios, online ministries 
Study centers and institutes, schools, colleges and universities
Political and social activist groups

And smaller, more localized movements:
Welfare and social services, including homeless shelters, child care, and domestic violence, disaster relief programs, food pantries and clothing closets, and emergency aid centers (such as the City Missions)
Self-help groups 
Bible study groups

Evangelical

International
Some international parachurch ministries include:

Alpha course
Awana
Bible Society
Billy Graham Evangelistic Association
CAMA Services
Child Evangelism Fellowship
Christian Missionary Fellowship International
Christian Motorcyclists Association
Christian Research Institute
Christians for Biblical Equality
City Missions and Gospel Rescue Missions
Compassion International
Covenant Players
Cru (Christian organization) including Athletes in Action, FamilyLife, the Jesus Film Project
CURE International
David C Cook
Everyman's Welfare Service
Every Home for Christ
Gideons International
Grace Covenant
Great Commission church movement
International Fellowship of Evangelical Students association of Christian student movements worldwide (including InterVarsity Christian Fellowship in the U.S.)
International House of Prayer founded by Mike Bickle (minister)
Langham Partnership International founded by John Stott
Living Waters Publications/The Way of the Master evangelism training programs headed by Kirk Cameron and Ray Comfort
Mercy Ships (founded by YWAM)
The Navigators
Operation Mobilisation
Prison Fellowship
Renovaré
Samaritan's Purse
Scripture Union
Teen Challenge
U.S. Center for World Mission
Word of Life Fellowship
World Vision International
Wycliffe Bible Translators
Young Life
Youth for Christ
Youth With A Mission (YWAM) international mission agency with particular focus on youth and the World's poor and disadvantaged.

United States and Canada
Some parachurch ministries in the United States and Canada include:
A Better World - an organization that is based in Lacombe, Alberta, Canada
Answers in Genesis Apologetics & Biblical authority ministry.
Christianity Today A leading periodical for evangelicals, founded by Billy Graham in 1956
CCO Regional campus ministry partnering with local churches.
Cru (Christian organization) including Athletes in Action, FamilyLife, the Jesus Film Project
Focus on the Family Resources for Christian families, singles, and various age groups, professions
Habitat for Humanity, known for extensive work by President Jimmy Carter
InterVarsity Christian Fellowship College ministry affiliated with the International Fellowship of Evangelical Students
Promise Keepers A renewal movement for men
Rapture Ready Promotes knowledge of Christian rapture theory
Ride for Refuge - a cycling event that raises awareness and funds for displaced persons
Samaritan's Purse Interdenominational disaster relief aid
Youth for Christ
Many crisis pregnancy centers in the United States are operated on a parachurch basis, having boards of directors not affiliated with or under the control of any single church or congregation.

Non-Evangelical specific

United Kingdom
Association of Interchurch Families, family support group
Christian Aid, international development agency backed by UK churches
Christians Against Poverty, a charity that deals with debt counselling 
Christian Concern For Our Nation, campaigning group on legal and political changes
Churches Together in England, national ecumenical organisation

International
MOPS International, a Christian mothers organization

References

Evangelical parachurch organizations
Evangelical Christianity-related lists
Christian parachurch organizations
Parachurch